Villigst is a Stadtteil (district) of the city Schwerte in North Rhine-Westphalia, Germany. On 31 December 2012, Villigst had a population of 3.309 inhabitants.
It lies south of the river Ruhr near Sauerland. It borders on Ergste, another district of Schwerte.
On 1 January 1975 Villigst was incorporated into the city Schwerte, before it belonged to Iserlohn.

References

External links 
 Villigst at Schwerte.de
 openstreetmap

Unna (district)
Geography of North Rhine-Westphalia